Sartore is a surname. Notable people with the surname include:

Francisco Sartore (born 1995), Brazilian footballer 
Giuseppe Sartore (1937–1995), Italian racing cyclist
Joel Sartore (born 1962), American photographer, speaker, author, and teacher

See also
Sartori